Woodlands is a part of the District of North Vancouver in British Columbia, Canada. It was first settled after the Second Boer War. The community is located at the foot of Mount Seymour on Indian Arm, itself a branch of Burrard Inlet, which forms Vancouver's harbour.

Education 

Woodlands is served by four community schools in nearby Deep Cove, Cove Cliff Elementary, Dorothy Lynas Elementary, Sherwood Park Elementary, and Seycove Secondary School. Students participating in French immersion programs attend Dorothy Lynas Elementary School and Windsor Secondary School.

See also
List of communities in British Columbia

References

North Vancouver (district municipality)